Rigidoporus vinctus is a plant pathogen infecting bananas.

References

Fungi described in 1852
Fungal plant pathogens and diseases
Banana diseases
Meripilaceae
Taxa named by Miles Joseph Berkeley